Pecchia is an Italian surname. Notable people with the surname include:

Fabio Pecchia (born 1973), Italian footballer and manager
Joseph Pecchia (1889–1974), French sport shooter
Lorenzo Pecchia (born 2002), Italian footballer

Italian-language surnames